Roy Rawlings may refer to:
 Roy Rawlings (footballer), Australian rules footballer
 Roy Willard Rawlings, member of the Rhode Island House of Representatives